The United States hosted the 1904 Summer Olympics in St. Louis, Missouri.

The United States won 231 medals, setting a record that still stands today. The Soviet Union came closest to beating the record with 195 medals at the 1980 Summer Olympics and currently lies in second place. The Soviets won a then-record 80 gold medals, surpassing the 76 golds won by the Americans in 1904, but were surpassed once again by the United States, who would win 83 gold medals at the 1984 Summer Olympics.

Medalists

Results by event

Archery

The United States first competed in archery at the 1904 Summer Olympics.

Athletics

Running

Jumping

Throwing

Multi-event competitions

Boxing

The United States first competed in boxing in 1904. The sport made its Olympic debut that year.

Jack Egan originally won the silver medal in the lightweight competition and the bronze medal in the welterweight competition. Later, it was discovered that his real name was Frank Joseph Floyd, whereas AAU rules made it illegal to fight under an assumed name. In November 1905, the AAU disqualified Egan from all AAU competitions and ordered him to return all his prizes and medals. Russell van Horn was awarded the silver and Peter Sturholdt awarded the bronze in the lightweight competition, while Joseph Lydon retained bronze in the welterweight competition.

Cycling

The United States competed in cycling.

Diving

The United States and Germany were the two nations that competed in diving.

Fencing

Football

The United States made its first appearance in football, known there as soccer, in 1904.  Two American club teams played in a round-robin with a Canadian team, with the Canadian team defeating both of the American squads. The Americans then played two scoreless draws against each other before one won the third contest, 2–0.

 Summary

 Standings

 Matches

 Roster – Christian Brothers College

 Roster – St. Rose Parish

Golf

Gymnastics

Turnverein

Swedish system

Lacrosse

Roque

Rowing

Swimming

Tennis

The United States was one of two nations to compete in tennis.

Tug of war

Water polo

Water polo is mentioned in the games reports for the 1904 Summer Olympics, but initially the water polo event was not included in the International Olympic Committee's medal database for the 1904 Games. However, the IOC later reconsidered and recognized the sport to be a part of the official program.

Weightlifting

Wrestling

The United States wrestling team competed in 1904 for the first time.

Notes

Sources

 
 

Nations at the 1904 Summer Olympics
1904
Olympics